Seyf Ali Kandi (also Romanized as Seyf ‘Alī Kandī and Seyf‘alī Kandī) is a village in Korani Rural District, Korani District, Bijar County, Kurdistan Province, Iran. At the 2006 census, its population was 225, in 53 families. The village is populated by Azerbaijanis.

References 

Towns and villages in Bijar County
Azerbaijani settlements in Kurdistan Province